Casey Kaufhold (born March 6, 2004) is an American archer competing in women's recurve events. She won the silver medal in the women's individual event at the 2021 World Archery Championships held in Yankton, United States. She competed in the women's individual and women's team events at the 2020 Summer Olympics held in Tokyo, Japan.

In 2019, she won the bronze medal in the women's individual recurve event at the Pan American Games held in Lima, Peru. She also won the gold medal in both the women's team recurve and mixed team recurve events.

Career 
In 2019, she competed in the women's team recurve event at the World Archery Championships held in 's-Hertogenbosch, Netherlands. Kaufhold, Khatuna Lorig and Erin Mickelberry advanced to the elimination rounds where they were eliminated in their first match against Sweden. In August 2019, Kaufhold and Josef Scarboro won the silver medal in the cadet mixed team recurve event at the World Archery Youth Championships held in Madrid, Spain.

In that same year, as part of the 2019 Archery World Cup, Kaufhold and Brady Ellison won the silver medal in the mixed team competition held in Medellín, Colombia. In September 2019, she set a new junior world record for the 72-arrow 70-metre ranking round with a score of 675 out of a possible 720 points.

She qualified at the 2021 US Olympic Trials to represent the United States at the 2020 Summer Olympics in Tokyo, Japan. She also set a new under-21 world record of 682 out of a possible 720 points during the qualification round. At the 2020 Summer Olympics, she placed 17th in the ranking round in the women's individual event. In the competition bracket, she defeated Inés de Velasco of Spain and she was then eliminated by Ren Hayakawa of Japan. In the team competition, the American team finished in third place in the opening round and they were eliminated in the competition bracket by Svetlana Gomboeva, Elena Osipova and Ksenia Perova of the ROC.

Two months after the Olympics, she won the silver medal in the women's individual event at the 2021 World Archery Championships held in Yankton, United States. In her semi-final, she defeated 2020 Tokyo Olympic champion An San of South Korea and, in her gold medal match, she lost against Jang Min-hee of South Korea. This was the first medal won by an American archer in this event in over thirty years. Two months later, she won three medals at the 2021 Junior Pan American Games held in Cali, Colombia: she won the gold medal in the mixed team event, the silver medal in the women's team event and the bronze medal in the women's individual event. A few months later, she won the 2021 Athlete of the Year award by World Archery Americas in the recurve cadet women category.

In 2022, she won the women's recurve event at the Vegas Shoot held in Las Vegas, United States.

Personal life 

She studies visualization at the College of Architecture of Texas A&M University.

Notes

References

External links 
 

Living people
2004 births
Place of birth missing (living people)
American female archers
Pan American Games medalists in archery
Pan American Games gold medalists for the United States
Pan American Games bronze medalists for the United States
Archers at the 2019 Pan American Games
Medalists at the 2019 Pan American Games
Olympic archers of the United States
Archers at the 2020 Summer Olympics
World Archery Championships medalists
21st-century American women